Penicillium austroafricanum is a fungus species of the genus of Penicillium

See also
List of Penicillium species

References

Fungi described in 2014
austroafricanum